Saint Urban is an unincorporated community in Lewis County, Washington, United States.

History

The town's existence began as German and Swiss immigrants settled the area in the late 1800s. The central hub of the community was located at the intersection of Military Road and Sargent Road and at its height of prosperity, consisted of a small store, a Catholic church, a school and a Grange hall. As of 2022, only the Grange hall and church remain.

Historic buildings and sites

The St. Urban Church, originally called the Assumption Catholic Church was dedicated on August 15, 1891, the day of the Feast of the Assumption. By the early 2000's the church building had become dilapidated and had been decommissioned, though the cemetery was still maintained. The Archdiocese of Seattle was contemplating destroying the building. A group of former residents and their descendants, concerned about the loss of a historic landmark, formed the St. Urban Settlement Foundation in an effort to save the church. Volunteers worked towards the restoration effort that culminated in the reopening of the building with a ceremony on August 15, 2010.

Education

A new school district, 37, was assigned on January 8, 1884. The original school was replaced with a somewhat larger building, and was located diagonally across the St. Urban intersection from the church.

References

Populated places in Lewis County, Washington
Unincorporated communities in Lewis County, Washington
Unincorporated communities in Washington (state)